Klaus Niedzwiedz (born February 24, 1951 in Dortmund, Germany) is a former professional race driver and motoring journalist.

Driver

His greatest success came in the 1980s as a driver for Ford.

Niedzwiedz rose to prominence when driving a Ford Capri for Zakspeed in the Deutsche Rennsport Meisterschaft. The turbocharged 1.4 L engine from the Zakspeed Ford Capri was later enlarged for the 1.7 L "Super Capri". With this 500+ hp car, Niedzwiedz established in 1982 the "eternal lap record" for Group 5 touring car racing at the old 22.8 km Nürburgring with 7:08.59, just 10 seconds slower than the F1 record of 6:58.60 set by Niki Lauda in 1975 (see: Nürburgring lap times).

During the 1982 season, Niedzwiedz also drove in the World Endurance Championship for Zakspeed, in a Ford C100. The Zakspeed-prepared Group C machine was run by the works Ford Germany team with Klaus Ludwig, Manfred Winkelhock and Marc Surer at the wheel, but the car was a midfielder at best, although Jonathan Palmer and Desiré Wilson scored a 4th place overall the 1,000 km of Brands Hatch in 1982. Ford Germany retracted their support and one car was sold to privateers, while the other chassis was evolved by Zakspeed into the C1/4 and the C1/8, making few appearances in international racing, but becoming a front-runner in the German Interserie, where it won the European championship in 1984 with Klaus Niedzwiedz.

In 1982 and 1987, he was the winner at the 24 Hours Nürburgring, in both events with Klaus Ludwig. Driving an Eggenberger Motorsport Ford Sierra he was runner-up in the World Touring Car Championship of 1987 and the Deutsche Tourenwagen Meisterschaft of 1989.

Between 1987 and 1996, Niedzwiedz drove six times in the Bathurst 1000. After driving for Eggenberger Motorsport in 1987, he drove Eggenberger built Sierra RS500s for Allan Moffat Racing in 1988, 1989, 1990 and 1992. He returned in 1996 to drive a Ford Falcon EB.

Niedzwiedz also drove for Allan Moffat Racing at the 1989 Fuji 500 and 1990 Sandown 500.

In 1998, he won the privateer title in the ADAC German Supertouring car championship (Super Tourenwagen Cup) with an Opel Vectra.

In 2003, he won a VLN race with Porsche 911 GT3 at the Nürburgring

Other events:
1981 24 Hours of Le Mans
1982 24 Hours of Le Mans
1988 24 Hours of Le Mans

Journalist
Since 1984, Niedzwiedz has worked as a journalist and television host in Germany, starting with moderation of Sat.1 magazine Treibstoff. Since 1997, he moderates n-tv Motor.

Tamiya Model

Racing record

Career summary

† As Niedzwiedz was a guest driver, he was ineligible to score points.
Footnotes

Complete World Sportscar Championship results
(key) (Races in bold indicate pole position) (Races in italics indicate fastest lap)

Footnotes

Complete 24 Hours of Le Mans results

Complete Deutsche Tourenwagen Meisterschaft results
(key) (Races in bold indicate pole position) (Races in italics indicate fastest lap)

Complete British Saloon Car Championship results
(key) (Races in bold indicate pole position; races in italics indicate fastest lap.)

Complete World Touring Car Championship results
(key) (Races in bold indicate pole position) (Races in italics indicate fastest lap)

Complete Bathurst 1000 results

Complete Super Tourenwagen Cup results
(key) (Races in bold indicate pole position) (Races in italics indicate fastest lap)

External links
bio at n-tv
 (for his appearance in Treibstoff)
Zakspeed Website
Profile of the highly successful Zakspeed-built Group 5 racing Capri

References

British Touring Car Championship drivers
Deutsche Tourenwagen Masters drivers
European Touring Car Championship drivers
German racing drivers
Racing drivers from North Rhine-Westphalia
Sportspeople from Dortmund
World Sportscar Championship drivers
World Touring Car Championship drivers
1951 births
24 Hours of Le Mans drivers
24 Hours of Spa drivers
Living people
Australian Endurance Championship drivers
Team Joest drivers
Mercedes-AMG Motorsport drivers
Nürburgring 24 Hours drivers
Sauber Motorsport drivers
Volkswagen Motorsport drivers